Juhan Albert Luur (26 May 1883, Sindi – 4 September 1937, Tartu) was an Estonian politician. He was a member of II Riigikogu.

References

1883 births
1937 deaths
People from Sindi, Estonia
People from Kreis Pernau
Christian People's Party (Estonia) politicians
Members of the Riigikogu, 1923–1926